Rafael Garzón was a Spanish photographer born in Granada in 1863 and died in 1923. His studio was in operation until 1935.

He held studios in:
Calle Triunfo 127, Córdoba.  The name of this studio was Estudio fotográfico Hispano-árabe Casa del Califa
Calle Alhambra 24, Granada (inside the Alhambra of Granada).
Calle Mendez Nuñez 5, Seville.

He recorded with his camera the landscapes and monuments of Andalucía. He became famous because of his photographic portraits made in his studio inside The Alhambra.
His photographs illustrated the Commercial Guide of Granada.

In Seville, where he arrived in 1901, he hold a studio with a sumptuous Arabic scenery in order to use it for his photographs.

He made portraits of the aristocracy of Seville and also of the first tourists of the 19th century who used to travel to Andalucía. This is why his photographs are spread outside Spain too. He also made albums and postcards of monuments of Seville.

Work

References
Historia General de la Fotografia en Sevilla by Miguel Angel Yañez Polo
Del Daguerrotipo a la Instamatic by Juan Miguel Sánchez Vigil

External links
Garzón grandson’s web
Catálogo Monumental de España. In this application of the Spanish Ministry of Culture for Google Earth, there are pictures of Garzón of Toledo (Town's Hall squeare), Seville (Cathedral) or Córdoba (Mezquita)

1863 births
1923 deaths
Orientalist painters
Spanish photographers